Sengchanthavong's gecko (Gekko sengchanthavongi) is a species of lizard in the family Gekkonidae. The species is endemic to Laos.

Etymology
The specific name, sengchanthavongi, is in honor of Sinnasone Sengchanthavong of the Office of Natural Resources and Environment, Khammouane Province, Laos.

Geographic range
G. sengchanthavongi is found in central Laos, in Khammouane Province.

Habitat

Description

References

Further reading
Luu VQ, Calame T, Nguyen TQ, Le MD, Ziegler T (2015). "Morphological and molecular review of the Gekko diversity of Laos with descriptions of three new species". Zootaxa 3986 (3): 279–306. (Gekko sengchanthavongi, new species).

Gekko
Reptiles described in 2015
Endemic fauna of Laos
Reptiles of Laos